Ectopleura larynx, or ringed tubularia, is a hydroid in the family Tubulariidae.

Distribution
Ectopleura larynx is found throughout the British Isles and is common in the Northern Atlantic Ocean.

Description
Ectopleura larynx forms colonies that are usually no more than 6 cm high. It is described as:The stems are tubular, with a yellowish coloured tegument and are branched at the base. The polyp colour is pale pink through to red, and consists of a central circlet of oral tentacles surrounded by paler but larger aboral tentacles

Habitat 
Ectopleura larynx is usually found on rocks or attached to algae. It is most common in shallow water, fouling piers and on the undersides of boats; in the British Isles, seas surrounding Great Britain, and the Americas. E. larynx grows in colonies and can tolerate exposed habitats and strong water currents.

References

Tubulariidae
Animals described in 1786